Laurentius of Echternach, was a scribe from Echternach in modern Luxembourg.

Laurentius wrote the Echternach martyrology in minuscule, and charters for the town of Echternach between 704 and 722.

His name may be a Latin rendering of the Irish personal name, Lorcán, so there is a possibility he was Irish

References
 "Manuscripts and palaeography, p.525, "A New History of Ireland", volume one, Dublin, 2006.

Irish writers
8th-century Irish people
8th-century Latin writers
Medieval Irish writers
8th-century Frankish writers